Ardonald is a rural area near Cairnie in Aberdeenshire, Scotland.

References

Villages in Aberdeenshire